

Seán Dublin Bay Rockall Loftus (1 November 1927 – 10 July 2010) was an Irish environmentalist, barrister and politician who drew attention to his campaign issues by changing his name. He was often known as "Dublin Bay Loftus". He was a member of Dublin City Council for 25 years, an alderman for much of that time, and a member of the Council's Planning and Development Committee. Loftus is often credited as being one of the first advocates for environmentalism in Irish politics, with former Green Party leader John Gormley stating that Loftus "led the way even before the Green Party came into existence. Sean never wavered in his pursuit of the highest environmental ideals". Besides his environmentalist views, Loftus subscribed to the label of Christian Democrat and was socially conservative, opposing moves by Taoiseach Garret FitzGerald to liberalise Irish laws around divorce, contraceptives, and abortion.

Background
Born Seán D. Loftus in Dublin in 1927, he was the eldest of seven siblings. He attended Coláiste Mhuire primary school on Parnell Square and received his secondary education at Catholic University School. His father was a doctor and Loftus attended medical school at University College Dublin but did not enjoy it, leaving before graduating. He moved to England in the late 1940s, where he worked as a builder. After six  years, he returned to Ireland to attend King's Inns, qualifying as a barrister. He returned to England for several years before moving to the United States, where he worked and lectured. He moved back to Ireland in 1961. Loftus specialised in town planning law, lecturing in law at Bolton Street College of Technology (later the Dublin Institute of Technology). A resident of Clontarf, he campaigned for the sustainable development of Dublin Bay. Loftus was a devout Catholic. While he lived in the United States, he was an active member of the Montclair, New Jersey branch of an Irish-American Catholic fraternal organisation, the Ancient Order of Hibernians (AOH). He was guest of honor at the 1960 AOH National Convention by invitation of the National President, Jeremiah J. O’Callaghan. Loftus moved back to Ireland in 1961.

Political career
During his time in America, Loftus met Eduardo Frei Montalva, who later became the leader of the Christian Democratic Party of Chile and President of Chile. The meeting with Montalva, who Loftus continued to admire afterwards, influenced Loftus to subscribe to the idea of Christian Democracy with corporatist influences. Due to this influence, during the late 1950s Loftus flirted with the hard-right "National Action" organisation, a group that advocated for "vocationalism", the localised Irish term for corporatism. 

In 1961, Loftus founded the Christian Democrat Party of Ireland and stood for election to Dáil Éireann at the 1961 general election in the Dublin North-East constituency, the first of sixteen attempts. Although the party would exist for two decades, the Christian Democrat Party of Ireland struggled to register themselves on Ireland's official register of political parties and fought numerous court cases to achieve this. However, they were unsuccessful and partially because of this, the party never became any grander than a nexus of Rockall supporters.

In 1972 the Dublin Port and Docks Board proposed the building of an oil refinery in Dublin Bay. The plan was vigorously opposed by environmentalists, including Loftus, on the grounds that it posed a serious risk of pollution. Despite the motion having the support of larger political groups, such as Official Sinn Féin, the planned oil refinery was eventually rejected in 1976 thanks in part to Loftus bringing a bucket of polluted water from the bay to a public inquiry. 

At the 1973 general election, Loftus stood for election to the Dáil in the Dublin North-Central constituency as a Christian Democrat on the issue of Dublin Bay. Because the party was too small to be registered under the 1963 Electoral Act, meaning Loftus would be listed as 'Independent', he changed his name by deed poll to Seán D. Christian Democrat Dublin Bay Loftus in order that his political affiliation and campaign issue would appear on the ballot paper. Although not elected, he succeeded in highlighting the issue and the proposal was eventually turned down by the Minister for Local Government, James Tully. With the momentum from his campaign against the Dublin Bay oil refinery building, Loftus was elected to Dublin Corporation in 1974.

It was under this last name that he was finally elected to the 22nd Dáil for the Dublin North-East constituency at the 1981 general election. This Dáil was short-lived, however, and he himself contributed to the end of his Dáil career when he voted against John Bruton's 1982 budget. During the early 1980s, Loftus supported the Anti H-Block movement and opposed attempts by Taoiseach Garret FitzGerald to liberalise Irish laws, suggesting FitzGerald was attempting "to dechristianise the people's constitution". At the February 1982 general election he stood in two constituencies, Dublin North-East and Dublin North-Central, but failed to win a seat in either.   

Loftus continued to contest Dáil and European Parliament elections until 1997. He remained on Dublin City Council, and served as Lord Mayor of Dublin from 1995 to 1996. 

The application was rejected in June 2010 by the planning board, An Bord Pleanála, while Loftus was in hospital, having undergone brain surgery. Local councillor Gerry Breen said its rejection was a "fitting tribute" to Loftus.

Personal life
In 1962, Loftus married Úna Uí Lachtnáin, a home economics teacher from Cootehill, County Cavan. They had 3 children. A committed Gaeilgeoir, she became heavily involved in Oireachtas na Gaeilge, and was elected President of Oireachtas na Gaeilge in 2011. Uí Lachtnáin also served several years as Chairperson of the Dublin City Community Forum and was a founding member of the Bull Island Action Group.

Death
Loftus died on 10 July 2010 at the Mater Private Hospital. His funeral mass took place at St. Gabriel's Roman Catholic Church in Dollymount and he was interred at St. Fintan's Cemetery, Sutton on 12 July 2010. He was survived by his wife, Úna, who died on 1 April 2014.

References

External links
Seán D. Christian Democrat Dublin Bay Loftus, RTÉ Archives, 23 February 1973.

 

1927 births
2010 deaths
Alumni of University College Dublin
Burials at St. Fintan's Cemetery, Sutton
Independent TDs
Irish Christian democrats
Irish barristers
Irish environmentalists
Lord Mayors of Dublin
Members of the 22nd Dáil